The 2015 Dartford Borough Council election took place on 7 May 2015 to elect members of the Dartford Borough Council in England. It was held on the same day as other local elections.

Election result 
"Residents Association" is the Swanscombe and Greenhithe Residents Association.

Turnout: 69.60%

|}

Ward results 
In multi-member wards, "majority" is taken as the difference in votes between the lowest of the elected and the highest of the not elected.

References

2015 English local elections
May 2015 events in the United Kingdom
2015
2010s in Kent